The 2021–22 NK Osijek season was the club's 108th season in existence and the 31st consecutive season in the top flight of Croatian football.

Players

Transfers

In

Out

 Total Spending: €4,650,000

 Total Income: €5,200,000

 Net Income: €550,000

Competitions

Overall record

HT Prva liga

League table

Results summary

Results by round

Matches

Croatian Cup

UEFA Europa Conference League

Second qualifying round

Third qualifying round

Friendlies

Pre-season

On-season (2021)

Mid-season

On-season (2022)

Player seasonal records
Updated 22 May 2022.

Goals

Source: Competitive matches

Clean sheets

Source: Competitive matches

Disciplinary record

Appearances and goals

Notes

References

External links

NK Osijek seasons
Osijek
2021–22 UEFA Europa Conference League participants seasons